Joaquim Duarte Gonçalves Isabelinha (5 December 1908 – 24 November 2009) was a Portuguese footballer of Académica de Coimbra and a medical doctor.

Born to a relatively modest family in Almeirim, Portugal, at a time that study at the secondary school aiming the university admission was considered a luxury in Portugal, Isabelinha studied at Liceu de Santarém (secondary school in Santarém) between 1922 and 1930, playing football for Leões de Santarém team.

In Coimbra, at the Faculty of Medicine of the University of Coimbra, where he graduated in 1936, he played for Académica de Coimbra and is remembered even today. Professionally, he qualified as a medical ophthalmologist in 1940.

Sources
Article on Gonçalves Isabelinha's 100th birthday 
Report about Gonçalves Isabelinha's death at 100

1908 births
2009 deaths
Portuguese footballers
Association football midfielders
Associação Académica de Coimbra – O.A.F. players
Portuguese centenarians
Men centenarians
University of Coimbra alumni
People from Almeirim
Sportspeople from Santarém District